Victor Comella Ferreres is a Spanish professor and author of Law, having been Visiting Professor at University of Texas at Austin and currently Senior Lecturer at Pompeu Fabra University, and also a published author of publications and books, being widely collected by libraries worldwide.

References

External links
Publication
2014 event

University of Texas at Austin faculty
Academic staff of Pompeu Fabra University
New York University School of Law faculty